Domingos Leite Pereira (19 September 1882 – 27 October 1956) was a Portuguese politician of the Portuguese First Republic. He had degrees in theology and literature of the University of Coimbra. He helped to improve the relationships between the republic and the Catholic Church during his government.

During his life he served in many political posts:
 President of the Municipal Chamber of Braga;
 Deputy in the constituent assembly, for the Democratic Party;
 President of the Chamber of Deputies;
 Minister of Public Instruction in the government of José Relvas in 1919;
 Prime Minister (President of the Ministry) for three times: from March 30 to June 29, 1919; from January 21 to March 8, 1920; and from August 1 to December 17, 1925;
 Minister of Foreign Affairs in various governments: in those of Álvaro de Castro (from November 20 to 30, 1920), Liberato Pinto (from November 30, 1920 to March 2, 1921); Bernardino Machado (March 2 to May 23, 1921); António Maria da Silva (November 30, 1922 to November 15, 1923); and, again, Álvaro de Castro (December 18, 1923 to July 6, 1924).

After the May 28, 1926 revolution that installed the Ditadura Nacional (National Dictatorship) that would be followed by António de Oliveira Salazar's fascist Estado Novo (New State) regime, he abandoned his political life. Until the end of his life in 1956, he served as President of the insurance company Douro.

References

1882 births
1956 deaths
People from Braga
Prime Ministers of Portugal
Presidents of the Chamber of Deputies of Portugal (1910–1926)
Democratic Party (Portugal) politicians
Government ministers of Portugal
Legislators in Portugal
University of Coimbra alumni